Vyoshki or Vëshki (Russian: Вёшки, IPA: [ˈvʲɵʂkʲɪ] ) is a rural locality (a (posyolok) under the administrative jurisdiction of the City of Mytishchi, Moscow Oblast, Russia. Population:

Etymology 
Вешка is a colloquial diminutive of the word веха, which means «a milestone»; a pole, pointed on one side, a branch that serves to indicate the path, boundaries of land plots, the layout of something on the terrain. Вёшка is an outdated and dialectic version of spelling and pronunciation, entrenched in the toponym.

Geography 
The  passes through the area and the  flows through it. The area is surrounded by forest on all sides.

Local cultural sights 
In the area, there are two Eastern Orthodox churches — St. Varus' Church at the exit from the highway to the Moscow Ring Road, on the territory of which the ecological park «On the unknown Mytishchi paths» is located, and the Church of Elijah the Prophet at the entrance to one of the neighboring NHPs in the northeast (both belonging to the Moscow Patriarchate), as well as the Stele in memory of the fallen soldiers, dedicated to the Great Patriotic War.

References



Rural localities in Moscow Oblast